The county football associations are the local governing bodies of association football in England and the Crown dependencies. County FAs exist to govern all aspects of football in England. They are responsible for administering club and player registration as well as promoting development amongst those bodies and referees.

Most of the county FAs align roughly along historic county boundaries, although some cover more than one county, and some of the major cities, particularly those with a strong football tradition, have their own FAs. The Sheffield FA was the first to be created, in 1867. Several institutions have county FA status in their own right, including each branch of the British Armed Forces, English Schools, and the Amateur Football Alliance, which has a strong presence in the south-east of England.
 
County football associations host 'county cups' – knockout cup competitions held at a sub-regional level, which are open to affiliated members of the county FA. Typically, county FAs will host cup competitions at the following levels: senior, intermediate, junior, women's, veterans, senior Sunday football, intermediate Sunday football and junior Sunday football.

The county football associations, along with their counterparts from Wales, Scotland and Northern Ireland, ran the Tesco Cup, a tournament for players under 16, from 2005 to 2011.

List of county FAs

See also
English football league system
The Football Association
The FA Council

References

External links
The County FAs, The FA
County FA contact details
County Football Associations, page 5, Premier League

 
England